Trnovče is a dispersed settlement in the hills northeast of Lukovica pri Domžalah in the eastern part of the Upper Carniola region of Slovenia.

References

External links

Trnovče on Geopedia

Populated places in the Municipality of Lukovica